Dennis Mizzi (born 19 May 1964 in Malta) was a professional footballer, during his career he played for Żurrieq, where he played as a striker.

Mizzi played for the Malta national football team in the UEFA Euro 1988 qualifying rounds.

References

Living people
1964 births
Maltese footballers
Malta international footballers
Floriana F.C. players
Ħamrun Spartans F.C. players
Żurrieq F.C. players
Vittoriosa Stars F.C. players

Association football forwards